Victoria Park is a harness racing venue located in Wolvega in Friesland in the Netherlands.

External links
(nl)Victoria Park

Horse racing venues
Sports venues in Friesland
Sport in Weststellingwerf